is a passenger railway station in the city of Tsukuba, Ibaraki Prefecture, Japan, operated by the Metropolitan Intercity Railway Company. Its station number is TX19.

Line
Kenkyū-gakuen Station is served by Metropolitan Intercity Railway Company (Tsukuba Express) and is located 55.6 km from the official starting point of the line at Akihabara Station.

Station layout
The station consists of two side opposed side platforms on a viaduct, with the station building located underneath.

Platforms

History
Kenkyū-gakuen Station opened on 24 August 2005.

Passenger statistics
In fiscal 2019, the station was used by an average of 7367 passengers daily (boarding passengers only).

Surrounding area

 COSTCO
  Kenkyū-gakuen Shop

See also
 List of railway stations in Japan

References

External links

 TX Kenkyu-gakuen Station 

Railway stations in Ibaraki Prefecture
Stations of Tsukuba Express
Tsukuba, Ibaraki
Railway stations in Japan opened in 2005